Boat Harbour Beach is a small seaside township located about  from Wynyard on the north-west coast of Tasmania. "Boat Harbour" is the name of the locality which surrounds the township.

Boat Harbour Primary School is a rural government funded public school situated at 17386 Bass Highway Boat Harbour Tasmania 7321. Located nearby are the Boat Harbour fire brigade and Boat Harbour post shop, which first opened on 1 November 1878.

History
Boat Harbour was originally named Jacobs' Boat Harbour after Captain John Jacobs, master of small vessels owned by the Van Diemen's Land Company. The vessels were used for trading between the VDL establishments at Circular Head and Woolnorth with Launceston, Tasmania between the late 1820s and the 1840s.

Gallery

Further reading
Flynn, Lis (1988) Our first one hundred: a review of the Boat Harbour district, the schools and inhabitants over the last 100 years till 1988: written and compiled for the school centenary in Australia's bicentennial year Boat Harbour Primary School, Boat Harbour, Tasmania.

References

Localities of Waratah–Wynyard Council
Towns in Tasmania